Tidiane Djiby Ba (born 23 July 1993) is a Senegalese professional footballer who plays as a defender for Bahraini Premier League club Sitra.

Club career

ŠKF iClinic Sereď
Djiby Ba made his Fortuna Liga debut for iClinic Sereď against Ružomberok on 21 July 2018, in a goal-less tie. He concluded his tenure in the club in December 2020.

FC Nitra
Djiby Ba joined Nitra in January 2021, after requesting his release from Sereď. In Nitra he reunited with his former manager Peter Lérant, who managed him earlier in Sereď.

References

External links
 
 
 Futbalnet profile 

1993 births
Living people
Footballers from Dakar
Senegalese footballers
Senegalese expatriate footballers
Association football defenders
FC Spartak Trnava players
FK Dubnica players
FK Baník Most players
ŠKF Sereď players
FC Nitra players
FK Fotbal Třinec players
Sitra Club players
Slovak Super Liga players
2. Liga (Slovakia) players
Czech National Football League players
Bahraini Premier League players
Expatriate footballers in Slovakia
Expatriate footballers in the Czech Republic
Expatriate footballers in Bahrain
Senegalese expatriate sportspeople in the Czech Republic
Senegalese expatriate sportspeople in Slovakia
Senegalese expatriate sportspeople in Bahrain